The 1961 season of the Venezuelan Primera División, the top category of Venezuelan football, was played by 5 teams. The national champions were Deportivo Italia.

Results

Standings

External links
Venezuela 1961 season at RSSSF

Ven
Venezuelan Primera División seasons
1961 in Venezuelan sport